Itziar is a neighborhood in Deba, Gipuzkoa, Spain, next to Mount Andutz. It is located 6 km from the town of Deba.

References

Municipalities in Gipuzkoa